Thierry Issiémou (born 31 March 1983) is a Gabonese former international footballer who played as a defensive midfielder.

Career

Club career
Issiémou has played club football in Gabon, Hungary, Poland, Tunisia and Réunion for Stade Mbombey, TP Akwembé, FC 105 Libreville, USM Libreville, Sogéa FC, Delta Téléstar, Debrecen, Vasas SC, Tunisian clubs US Monastir, EGS Gafsa and JS Saint-Pierroise.

In November 2008, signed a preliminary contract with FC Karpaty Lviv, in January 2009, Karpaty refused his services.

International career
Issiémou made his international debut for Gabon in 2002, and has appeared in FIFA World Cup qualifying matches.

References

1983 births
Living people
Sportspeople from Libreville
Gabonese footballers
Association football midfielders
Gabon international footballers
2010 Africa Cup of Nations players
Gabonese expatriate footballers
Expatriate footballers in Hungary
US Monastir (football) players
Gabonese expatriate sportspeople in Tunisia
Delta Téléstar players
EGS Gafsa players
JS Saint-Pierroise players
Expatriate footballers in Réunion
21st-century Gabonese people
Gabonese expatriate sportspeople in Hungary
Gabonese expatriate sportspeople in Réunion
AC Bongoville players